The Women's 1500 metres competition at the 2017 World Single Distances Speed Skating Championships was held on 12 February 2017.

Results
The race was started at 18:00.

References

2017 World Single Distances Speed Skating Championships
World